The Aero Spacelines Mini Guppy was a large, wide-bodied, American cargo aircraft used for aerial transport of outsized cargo components. The Mini Guppy is one of the Guppy line of aircraft produced by Aero Spacelines.

Mini Guppy versions
Two versions of the Mini Guppy were produced. Both versions are colloquially referred to as the "Mini Guppy".

Both Mini Guppies were built using parts salvaged from a surplus Boeing 377, but with an all-new fuselage. This enabled Aero Spacelines to widen the Mini Guppy cargo bay floor to 13 ft (4 m), as opposed to the 8 ft (2.4 m) restriction imposed when building directly onto a B-377 fuselage. Borrowed parts included the cockpit, wings, and tail.

Mini Guppy

The Mini Guppy, or "MG", was built with a swing-tail to
facilitate cargo loading. It was powered by the original Pratt & Whitney R-4360 Wasp Major piston engines, enabling it to carry a maximum load of 32,000 pounds (14,500 kg), and cruise at 250 mph (400 km/h). Its cargo bay was 18 ft (5.5 m) in diameter, and a maximum of 91 ft 6 in (27.9 m) long, with a 73 ft 2 in (22.3 m) constant section.

The Mini Guppy first flew on May 24, 1967, and Aero Spacelines operated it for several years, ferrying contract cargo, including NASA's famed Pioneer 10 space probe and the Goodyear Europa until it was sold to American Jet Industries in 1974. American Jet Industries sold it to Aero Union in 1980, who sold it to Erickson Air Crane eight years later. Erickson Air Crane used the Mini Guppy to haul heavy equipment until 1995, when it was retired to the Tillamook Air Museum in Tillamook, Oregon, where it resides today.

Mini Guppy Turbine 
The second version was officially known as the Mini Guppy Turbine (MGT) and Guppy 101. It was the first Guppy aircraft to feature upgraded Allison 501-D22C turboprop engines. Like the MG, the MGT had a 73 ft 2 in (22.3 m) constant diameter section of the cargo hold, but the overall length had been increased to 103 ft 2 in (31.4 m), and the diameter was slightly wider: 18 ft 4 in (5.6 m). This, combined with the upgraded engines, enabled it to carry a maximum payload of 62,925 pounds (28,540 kg), almost twice the load the MG could handle. It was built with a swing-nose for easier cargo loading.

The MGT first took to the air on March 13, 1970, but was short-lived. On May 12, 1970, the Mini Guppy Turbine was lost, along with the entire crew, in an accident during flight testing at Edwards Air Force Base, California.

See also
 Pregnant Guppy, the original Guppy
 Super Guppy, larger successor to the Pregnant Guppy
 Conroy Skymonster

Bibliography

External links

 All About Guppys
 Aero Spacelines 377MGT Mini Guppy Turbine (Guppy 101)
 Aero Spacelines 377MGT Mini Guppy Turbine (Guppy 101) accident
 Aero Spacelines 377MGT Mini Guppy Turbine Accident Description
 NTSB Accident Report
 Boeing B-377 at Boeing.com

Mini Guppy
1960s United States cargo aircraft
Four-engined tractor aircraft
Low-wing aircraft
Guppy, Mini
Aircraft first flown in 1967
Four-engined piston aircraft
Four-engined turboprop aircraft

de:Guppy (Flugzeug)